Megalepthyphantes nebulosus is a species of sheetweb spider in the family Linyphiidae. It is found in North America, Europe, Turkey, Caucasus, and from European Russia to the Far East.

References

Linyphiidae
Articles created by Qbugbot
Spiders described in 1830